Lamont is a census-designated place (CDP) in Kern County, California, United States. The population was 15,120 at the 2010 census, up from 13,296 at the 2000 census.

Geography

History
Lamont was founded in 1923. The first post office opened in 1947.
During the 1930s–1950s, large numbers of farm workers migrated to the Lamont area from the east seeking relief from the Great Depression and the Dust Bowl.

The first public library in Lamont was opened in June 1912. It was located in the Weedpatch home of Phoebe Wells. Growth was rapid in the Lamont region, with the influx of workers in the oil industry, and in 1935, the library was moved to a new building. In 1952, the Kern County Board of Supervisors purchased a lot to construct a building that would house the library and a public health center. The facility was opened in January 1953. The branch remained in that building until January 1974, when it was relocated to a newer and larger location. Five years later, the branch was moved yet again to the former Lamont Community Building. To meet the ever-growing needs projected for the population in 1990, construction for a new building was made possible through funds provided by the California State Library under the Library Services and Construction Act, Title II, Community Development Block Grant funds from the United States Department of Housing and Urban Development. The old building was demolished, the new building was built, and opened to the public in early spring of 1998.

Demographics

2010
The 2010 United States Census reported that Lamont had a population of 15,120. The racial makeup of Lamont was 6,677 (44.2%) White, 130 (0.9%) African American 230 (1.5%) Native American, 72 (0.5%) Asian, 9 (0.1%) Pacific Islander, 7,351 (48.6%) from other races, and 651 (4.3%) from two or more races. Hispanics or Latinos of any race were 14,293 persons (94.5%).

The Census reported that 15,119 people lived in households, one lived in non-institutionalized group quarters, and no one was institutionalized.

Of the 3,405 households, 2,250 (66.1%) had children under the age of 18 living in them, 1,806 (53.0%) were opposite-sex married couples living together, 740 (21.7%) had a female householder with no husband present, 413 (12.1%) had a male householder with no wife present, 349 (10.2%) were unmarried opposite-sex partnerships, and 15 (0.4%) were same-sex married couples or partnerships. Some 270 households (7.9%) were made up of individuals, and 122 (3.6%) had someone living alone who was 65 years of age or older. The average household size was 4.44.  With 2,959 families (86.9% of all households), the average family size was 4.46.

The population was distributed as 5,411 people (35.8%) under the age of 18, 2,253 people (14.9%) aged 18 to 24, 4,194 people (27.7%) aged 25 to 44, 2,453 people (16.2%) aged 45 to 64, and 809 people (5.4%) who were 65 years of age or older.  The median age was 24.7 years. For every 100 females, there were 111.7 males.  For every 100 females age 18 and over, there were 117.9 males.

The 3,598 housing units averaged 777.8 per square mile (300.3/km), of which 1,536 (45.1%) were owner-occupied, and 1,869 (54.9%) were occupied by renters. The homeowner vacancy rate was 1.5%; the rental vacancy rate was 3.3%;  7,065 people (46.7% of the population) lived in owner-occupied housing units and 8,054 people (53.3%) lived in rental housing units.

2000
As of the census of 2000, there were 13,296 people, 3,114 households, and 2,690 families residing in the CDP. The 3,277 housing units averaged 711.8 per square mile (275.1/km). The racial makeup of the CDP was 44.50% White, 2.79% Black or African American, 1.53% Native American, 1.04% Asian, 0.08% Pacific Islander, 46.12% from other races, and 3.93% from two or more races. About 88.85% of the population was Hispanic or Latino of any race.

Of the 3,114 households, 58.9% had children under the age of 18 living with them, 58.8% were married couples living together, 18.7% had a female householder with no husband present, and 13.6% were not families. About 9.8% of all households were made up of individuals, and 4.5% had someone living alone who was 65 years of age or older.  The average household size was 4.27 and the average family size was 4.41.

In the CDP, the population was distributed as 38.6% under the age of 18, 12.9% from 18 to 24, 29.2% from 25 to 44, 13.8% from 45 to 64, and 5.5% who were 65 years of age or older.  The median age was 24 years. For every 100 females, there were 108.3 males.  For every 100 females age 18 and over, there were 111.1 males.

The median income for a household in the CDP was $25,578, and for a family was $25,518. Males had a median income of $17,367 versus $14,527 for females. The per capita income for the CDP was $7,915.  About 29.7% of families and 31.7% of the population were below the poverty line, including 37.5% of those under age 18 and 17.0% of those age 65 or over.

Education
Lamont is served by the Lamont School District and the Kern High School District. The Lamont School District consists of Lamont Elementary School, Alicante Avenue School, Myrtle Avenue School, and Mountain View Middle School. The Kern High School District maintains Nueva High School.

Public safety
The Kern County Sheriff's Department Lamont substation is responsible for providing law enforcement. Kern County Fire Department Station 51 provides fire protection. Hall Ambulance is the provider of emergency medical services.

Media
The Lamont Reporter is the local weekly newspaper.

Events

Every December, the community gathers together to kick off the holiday season with a parade down Main Street, hosted by the Lamont Chamber of Commerce.

See also
Camp Lamont

References

Census-designated places in Kern County, California
Populated places established in 1923
Census-designated places in California